Associazione Calcio Fidenza 1922 is an Italian association football club located in Fidenza, Emilia-Romagna. It currently plays in Serie D.

History 
The club was founded in 1922.

In the 2010–11 season, the team played in Eccellenza Emilia–Romagna/A, finishing the championship in 2nd position. On 5 August 2011 Fidenza was admitted to Serie D to fill vacancies.

Team colours 
Its colors are white and black.

References

External links
 Official site

Football clubs in Italy
Association football clubs established in 1922
Football clubs in Emilia-Romagna
1922 establishments in Italy